Ross Davis (born 1994) is an international lawn bowls player from Jersey. He became the British singles champion after winning the British Isles Bowls Championships in 2018.

Bowls career

Commonwealth Games
Davis represented Jersey at the 2018 Commonwealth Games on the Gold Coast, Australia. He competed in the triples event where the team reached the quarter finals. In October 2021, Davis was selected to represent Jersey in the 2022 Commonwealth Games being held in Birmingham. In 2022, he competed in the men's singles and the men's pairs at the 2022 Commonwealth Games.

Other events
Davis has won three British titles, he won the blue riband event (the singles) in 2018 in addition to the 2016 fours and 2019 pairs. In 2019 he won the pairs bronze medal at the Atlantic Bowls Championships. In 2020 he was selected for the 2020 World Outdoor Bowls Championship in Australia.

He is the Junior Vice President of Bowls Jersey.

References

Jersey bowls players
1994 births
Living people
Bowls players at the 2018 Commonwealth Games
Bowls players at the 2022 Commonwealth Games
Commonwealth Games competitors for Jersey